William Heard may refer to:

 William Wright Heard (1853–1926), Governor of Louisiana, 1900–1904
 William Heard (cardinal) (1884–1973), Scottish cardinal of the Roman Catholic Church
 William H. Heard (biologist), American malacologist
 William Henry Heard (1850–1937), American clergyman and diplomat